Streptomyces taklimakanensis is a bacterium species from the genus of Streptomyces which has been isolated from the Taklimakan Desert in Alar City in China.

See also 
 List of Streptomyces species

References 

taklimakanensis
Bacteria described in 2020